Hotline is the sixth studio album by American rock band The J. Geils Band. The album was released on September 9, 1975, by Atlantic Records.

The intro of "Believe in Me" also became the intro tune to the German Rockpalast rock events.

Track listing

Personnel
Peter Wolf – lead vocals
J. Geils – guitar
Magic Dick – harmonica
Seth Justman – keyboards
Danny Klein – bass
Stephen Jo Bladd – drums

Production
Producers: Bill Szymczyk, Allan Blazek, Seth Justman
Engineers: Allan Blazek, Bill Szymczyk, David Thoener
Mastering: Alex Sadkin
Digital mastering: Zal Schreiber
Arranger: J. Geils Band
Special assistance: Juke Joint Jimmy
Design: Peter Corriston
Cover design: Louis Brooks
Cover art concept: Peter Corriston
Photography: Juke Joint Jimmy

Charts

References

1975 albums
The J. Geils Band albums
Albums produced by Bill Szymczyk
Atlantic Records albums
Albums with cover art by Peter Corriston